2009 UEFA U-19 Championship (qualifying round) was the first round of qualifications for the Final Tournament of 2009 UEFA European Under-19 Championship. The final tournament of the 2009 UEFA European Under-19 Championship is preceded by two qualification stages: a qualifying round and an Elite round. During these rounds, 52 national teams are competing to determine the seven teams that will join the already qualified host nation Ukraine.

The first qualifying round was played between 2 October and 27 November 2008. The 52 teams were divided into 13 groups of four teams, with each group being contested as a mini-tournament, hosted by one of the group's teams. After all matches have been played, the 13 group winners and 13 group runners-up advanced to the Elite round. Alongside the 26 winner and runner-up teams, the two best third-placed teams also qualified.

The host team of each group's mini-tournament are indicated in italics in the tables below.

First qualification round groups

Group 1

Group 2

Group 3

Group 4

Group 5

Group 6

Group 7

Group 8

Group 9

Group 10

Group 11

Group 12

Group 13

Ranking of third-placed teams 
Ranking includes all matches in the group. Top two, Slovakia and Belarus, advanced to the Elite Round.

See also
2009 UEFA European Under-19 Championship
2009 UEFA European Under-19 Championship elite qualification

Qualification
UEFA European Under-19 Championship qualification